Return to the Moon is the debut studio album by American indie rock band EL VY, released on October 30, 2015 on 4AD. A collaboration between Matt Berninger (singer for The National) and Brent Knopf (Ramona Falls, Menomena), the two musicians had befriended one another on tour and exchanged sketches of music and lyrics for years, before getting together in the winter of 2014 to formally record an album.

Reception

Return to the Moon was met with a largely favorable reception from music critics. On Metacritic, the album has a weighted average score of 73 out of 100 based on 25 reviews, indicating "generally favorable reviews". 

Josh Modell of The A.V. Club praised Return to the Moon as "one of the best albums of 2015" and proclaimed that "it stands shoulder to miserable, brilliant shoulder" next to Berninger's work with The National. In his 4 out of 5 star review for NME, Rob Cooke drew comparisons to Knopf's former band, Menomena, writing that "fans of the brilliantly inventive art-rock band...will find lots to love in "Paul Is Alive"'s sparse, springy synths, the claustrophobic crunch of "Sad Case" and the brittle post-punk of "Happiness, Missouri"." Critics were divided by the recontextualization of Berninger's songwriting and vocals with Knopf's keyboard-heavy arrangements - while Rolling Stone expressed that "Matt Berninger has never sounded more like himself", Pitchfork labeled the project "muddled and confused, unsure of a clear direction to take."

Accolades

Track listing
All songs written by Matt Berninger and Brent Knopf; additional lyrics written by Carin Besser.

Personnel
EL VY
Matt Berninger
Brent Knopf
Matt Sheehy - touring member
Andy Stack - touring member

Additional musicians
Drew Shoals - drums 
John O'Reilly, Jr. - drums 
Lauren Jacobson - violin
Ural Thomas, Moorea Masa, Allison Hall, and Margaret Wehr - backing vocals

Production
Brent Knopf - production, engineering
Craig Silvey - mixing
Greg Calbi - mastering
Jeff Stuart Saltzman - drum engineering
Tim Shrout - drum engineering and editing assistance
Sean O'Brien - vocal engineering
Eduardo de la Paz - mixing assistance
Zach Stamler - editing assistance
Matt Sheehy - editing assistance

Artwork
Deirdre O'Callaghan - photography
John Solimine - logo design
Alison Fielding - packaging layout

Charts

Weekly charts

Year-end charts

References

2015 debut albums
EL VY albums
4AD albums